Serdar Dursun (born 19 October 1991) is a Turkish professional footballer who plays as a forward for Fenerbahçe. Born in Germany, he plays for the Turkey national team.

Career
Dursun began his senior career with the reserves of Hannover 96 in 2010, and moved to Turkey thereafter with Eskişehirspor. From Eskişehirspor, he had two short loans with Şanlıurfaspor and Denizlispor before transferring to Karagümrük in 2014. In 2016, he returned to Germany with Greuther Fürth and then Darmstadt 98 in 2018.

Dursun completed 2020–21 2. Bundesliga season with 27 goals, making him the top-scorer of the season.

Fenerbahçe
On 15 June 2021, Dursun signed a three-year deal with option for fourth with Turkish side Fenerbahçe. He made his debut on 26 September in a 2–1 away win over Hatayspor. He scored his first goal for the club on 24 October in a 2–1 home loss against Alanyaspor. On 5 December, he scored a hat-trick in a 4–0 win over Çaykur Rizespor.

On 12 February 2022, in a 2–1 win over Giresunspor, Dursun, who entered the game in the second half of the match, suffered a head injury in the 51st minute of the match and was only able to play 7 minutes, being replaced by Mërgim Berisha in the 58th minute. Fenerbahçe stated that it was determined that a displaced fracture occurred in his zygomatic bone after the blow he received in the match.

International career
Born in Germany, Dursun is of Turkish descent. He debuted with the Turkey national team as a late sub in a 2–1 2022 FIFA World Cup qualification win over Latvia on 11 October 2021, scoring his side's first goal in the 75th minute.

Career statistics

Club

International

Scores and results list Turkey's goal tally first, score column indicates score after each Dursun goal.

Honours
Individual
 2. Bundesliga top scorer: 2020–21

References

External links
 

1991 births
Living people
German people of Turkish descent
Citizens of Turkey through descent
Turkish footballers
German footballers
Footballers from Hamburg
Association football forwards
Turkey international footballers
Hannover 96 II players
Eskişehirspor footballers
Şanlıurfaspor footballers
Denizlispor footballers
Fatih Karagümrük S.K. footballers
SpVgg Greuther Fürth players
SV Darmstadt 98 players
Regionalliga players
Süper Lig players
TFF First League players
TFF Second League players
2. Bundesliga players